Pellenes marionis is a species of jumping spiders. They are found in the island of Sal, Cape Verde. The species was first described by Joachim Schmidt and Otto Krause in 1994 as Bianor marionis. It was transferred to the genus Pellenes by D. V. Logunov in 2001.

References

Salticidae
Spiders of Africa
Spiders described in 1994
Arthropods of Cape Verde
Endemic fauna of Cape Verde
Fauna of Sal, Cape Verde